Estádio Luís Pereira was a multi-use stadium in Ribeirão Preto, Brazil. It was initially used as the stadium of Botafogo Futebol Clube matches.  It was replaced by Estádio Santa Cruz in 1967.  The capacity of the stadium was 15,000 spectators.

References
 Stadium history

Defunct football venues in Brazil
Botafogo Futebol Clube (SP)